Yvonne Marianne Elliman (born December 29, 1951) is an American singer, songwriter, and actress who performed for four years in the first cast of the stage musical Jesus Christ Superstar. She scored a number of hits in the 1970s and achieved a US #1 hit with "If I Can't Have You". The song also reached #9 on the Adult Contemporary chart and number 4 in the UK Chart. Her cover of Barbara Lewis's "Hello Stranger" went to #1 on the Adult Contemporary chart, and "Love Me" was also #5, giving her 3 top 10 singles. After a long hiatus in the 1980s and 1990s, during which time she dedicated herself to her family, she made a comeback album as a singer-songwriter in 2004.

Biography

Early years
Elliman was born and raised in the Manoa neighborhood of Honolulu, Hawaii. Her mother was of Japanese descent and her father, a salesman for Best Foods, was of Irish descent. Elliman showed interest in music from an early age, playing the ukulele by age four and taking piano lessons at age seven. While attending President Theodore Roosevelt High School, Elliman performed in the school band on standup bass and violin. However, she became most proficient on the guitar and performed as a singer and guitarist in a folk music band named We Folk, which she formed with schoolmates. The band fared well in local talent shows. 

According to Elliman, she was truant during her senior year at high school but graduated owing to the intervention of the school's British-born band teacher (Peter Wilcox), who persuaded her teachers to pass her and encouraged 17-year-old Elliman to relocate to London and pursue a musical career, which she did shortly after graduating.

London years, Jesus Christ Superstar

Elliman's singing career began in 1969 in London, where she performed in bars and clubs. At the time she did not like what she was singing. "I hated the music then", she recalled in a 1973 interview, adding, "I did it for the bread. I was into drugs and all that, and thought Grace Slick and the Jefferson Airplane was it". While still an unknown, she was discovered by Tim Rice and Andrew Lloyd Webber, who asked her to sing Mary Magdalene's part for the original audio recording of Jesus Christ Superstar featuring Ian Gillan singing as Jesus. After its release as an album in 1970, they invited her to join the stage show's traveling cast, which she did for four years.

She had her first Billboard Hot 100 hit single in 1971 with the ballad "I Don't Know How to Love Him" from Jesus Christ Superstar. Her original version was not issued as a single until a cover version by Helen Reddy started moving up the U.S. charts; appearing concurrently on the charts (a rare event, not common since the 1950s, when different releases played in different parts of the United States), Elliman's original peaked at #28, while Reddy's cover peaked at #13. In the end, Elliman performed on the 1970 concept album, in the original Broadway cast (1971), and in the 1973 film. She and Barry Dennen were alone among the cast to have performed on the original record, original Broadway production and the film. Her performance in the film as Mary Magdalene led to a 1974 Golden Globe nomination for Best Actress in a Motion Picture Comedy or Musical.

New York and disco
In 1971, aged 19, Elliman moved to New York City for the Broadway production of Jesus Christ, Superstar, where she met her first husband, Bill Oakes, who was President of Robert Stigwood's RSO Records. Before that she was signed to Purple Records, singing on Jon Lord's album Gemini Suite in 1971 and releasing her second solo album Food of Love in 1973. She was asked to sing backing vocals on Eric Clapton's version of the Bob Marley song "I Shot the Sheriff" in 1974. She then went on tour as part of Clapton's band, and soon afterwards got her own recording contract with RSO Records. She would continue to work with Clapton, performing on his albums from 1974-77, including 461 Ocean Boulevard, There's One in Every Crowd, E. C. Was Here, No Reason to Cry, and Slowhand. A first album for the RSO label (her third in all), Rising Sun, produced by Steve Cropper, produced no hit singles, but her next album, Love Me, produced by Freddie Perren, gave her two top-20 hits, "Love Me" (written by Barry and Robin Gibb), and a Barbara Lewis cover, "Hello Stranger". "Hello Stranger" topped the U.S. Easy Listening chart for four weeks, and was also a No. 15 pop hit in 1977, while "Love Me" was a No. 14 pop hit in late 1976/early 1977.

Also in 1977, the Bee Gees were working on Saturday Night Fever and wrote "How Deep Is Your Love" for her, but Stigwood wanted the Bee Gees to perform it. Instead, she sang "If I Can't Have You". The song became a number-one hit on the Billboard Hot 100; it is generally considered the high point of her recording career.

A few minor top 40 hits followed in 1979, including the title theme song from the film Moment by Moment and another disco track, "Love Pains", which was a major club success. She appeared in Hawaii Five-O  in a two-part episode ("Number One with a Bullet", 1978) as an aspiring singer, performing the song "I Can't Get You Outa My Mind" with fellow guest performer James Darren. The single "Savannah" was also a minor hit.

Hiatus and Return
After spending a decade pursuing her career, Elliman went on hiatus to  dedicate herself to her two children.

Then, in 2004, Elliman reappeared on the music scene when she released her album titled Simple Needs, with all songs written by Elliman. She then re-released the album globally in 2007. 

Elliman has continued performing at music festivals, benefits, and concerts throughout the country and around the world. She also performed on a PBS special on '70s soul music in 2004, singing "If I Can't Have You." In 2014 she reunited with Ted Neeley and Barry Dennen in Verona for a special Jesus Christ Superstar event. Elliman is featured on the 2014 Ted Neeley EP Rock Opera performing a duet with Neeley in "Up Where We Belong". In summer 2018 she joined in 45th anniversary Superstar film screenings events in Los Angeles, and shared the experience with fans on Facebook.

Personal life
Elliman was married to RSO Records executive Bill Oakes from 1972 to 1980. She then married songwriter Wade Hyman in 1981 and they had two children, Sage (born 1982) and Ben (born 1986). They later separated and divorced. She married Allan Alexander in January 2016.

On August 16, 2017, Elliman was slated to sing in Guam for a Catholic school charity when she was stopped by customs for possession of marijuana and methamphetamine. After spending a night in jail, she and her husband pleaded guilty to possession of a controlled substance, continued with the planned concert and were allowed to return to Hawaii on probation until their March 2018 sentencing. They were ordered to perform community service and serve the remainder of a two-week sentence, Billboard magazine said, "by observing courtroom proceedings of a drug offender probation program in Honolulu."

Discography

 Yvonne Elliman (1972)
 Food of Love (1973)
 Rising Sun (1975)
 Love Me (1977)
 Night Flight (1978)
 Yvonne (1979)
 Simple Needs (2004)

See also
List of number-one hits (United States)
List of artists who reached number one on the Hot 100 (U.S.)

References

External links

1951 births
Living people
American dance musicians
American women pop singers
American film actresses
American musical theatre actresses
Grammy Award winners
Decca Records artists
American people of Irish descent
Actresses from Honolulu
Musicians from Honolulu
American musicians of Japanese descent
RSO Records artists
President Theodore Roosevelt High School alumni
American women musicians of Japanese descent
21st-century American women